The yellow-collared chlorophonia (Chlorophonia flavirostris) is a bird species in the family Fringillidae (it was formerly placed in Thraupidae).
It is found in Colombia, Ecuador, and Panama.
Its natural habitats are subtropical or tropical moist lowland forest and subtropical or tropical moist montane forest.

References

yellow-collared chlorophonia
Birds of the Colombian Andes
Birds of the Ecuadorian Andes
yellow-collared chlorophonia
yellow-collared chlorophonia
Taxonomy articles created by Polbot